Mohamad Naser Al Sayed (born November 2, 1981) is a Qatari chess Grandmaster (since 2009). He is ranked 2nd best player in Qatar. As of January 2021, his FIDE Elo rating is 2484.

Performance in competitions
Al-Sayed claimed the 3rd Arab elite chess championship title in Dubai, in June 2015.

He has played for Qatar at eleven chess Olympiads since 1994.

References 

1981 births
Chess grandmasters
Living people
Qatari chess players
Chess players at the 2006 Asian Games
Chess players at the 2010 Asian Games
Asian Games competitors for Qatar